Planodes quaternarius is a species of beetle in the family Cerambycidae. It was described by Newman in 1842. It is known from the Philippines.

Varietas
 Planodes quaternarius var. bimaculatus Aurivillius, 1927
 Planodes quaternarius var. evanescens Kriesche, 1936
 Planodes quaternarius var. schultzei Heller, 1913

References

quaternarius
Beetles described in 1842